Willard Brook State Forest is a publicly owned forest with recreational features located in the towns of Ashby and Townsend, Massachusetts. The forest's fast-running brook and tree stands of a classic New England nature give it a character more in line with that of the forests found farther west in the state. It is managed by the Department of Conservation and Recreation.

History
The forest was established through state purchase of lands in 1930. While no Civilian Conservation Corps camp was established in this state forest, CCC workers from other areas were active here at various times from 1933 to 1940, developing recreational features at Damon Pond and Trap Brook Falls.

Activities and amenities
Forest trails are available for hiking, horseback riding, mountain biking, cross-country skiing, and snowmobiling. The Friends Trail connects with the campground at Pearl Hill State Park. The forest also offers a campground, picnicking, swimming, fishing, and restricted hunting.

References

External links
Willard Brook State Forest Department of Conservation and Recreation
Willard Brook State Forest Trail Map Department of Conservation and Recreation

State parks of Massachusetts
Massachusetts state forests
Massachusetts natural resources
Parks in Middlesex County, Massachusetts
Campgrounds in Massachusetts
Civilian Conservation Corps in Massachusetts
Protected areas established in 1930
1930 establishments in Massachusetts